Albert Sturgess (21 October 1882 – 16 July 1957) was an English footballer who played in the Football League for Norwich City, Sheffield United and Stoke, and the England national team.

Club career
Sturgess started his career with amateur side Tunstall Cresswells before joining Stoke in 1902. He broke into the first team in 1905–06 thanks to the departure of James Bradley to Liverpool. Stoke, who had survived several relegation battles in the early 1900s, were relegated in 1906–07 and financial difficulties led to the club falling out of the Football League in 1907–08. To raise funds, Sturgess was sold to Sheffield United in 1908.

Arriving at Sheffield United alongside George Gallimore, for the maximum transfer fee at the time of £350, Sturgess played primarily at wing-half or half-back, forging a formidable partnership with George Utley and Bill Brelsford. He made his début for the Blades in a Division One match at Bury on 1 September 1908, replacing Ernest Needham at left-half.

Part of the victorious Sheffield United FA Cup winning team of 1915, when United beat Chelsea 3–1 at Old Trafford, on 24 April 1915, he went on to make 353 league appearances for the Blades, scoring five goals, between 1908 and 1922.

After the First World War, he played mainly as a full-back but was utilised in most positions in the team.
In 1923, he joined Norwich City where he made 47 appearances, helping them to what was then their best-ever league finish, 11th in Division Three South. He retired from football in 1925, aged 42.

Playing style

Sturgess, although not as naturally gifted as some of his contemporaries, was noted for his determination and willingness to graft; he was a tall, wiry defender, nicknamed hairpin because of his build. He was renowned for his skill in tackling and long, accurate kicking, and was almost ever-present in the Sheffield United team until his late thirties.

Later life and death
A native of Etruria, Sturgess opened a china shop in Ecclesall Road, Sheffield. He died in 1957, aged 74.

International career
While with Sheffield United, Sturgess won 2 England caps – versus Northern Ireland at the Baseball Ground on 11 February 1911, and versus Scotland at Hampden Park on 14 April 1914.

Career statistics

Club
Source:

International
Source:

Honours
Sheffield United
FA Cup: Winners 1915

References
 Specific

General
Clarebrough, Denis (1989). Sheffield United F.C., The First 100 years. Sheffield United Football Club. .
Young, Percy A. (1962). Football in Sheffield. Stanley Paul & Co. Ltd .

External links

 England profile

1882 births
1957 deaths
English footballers
England international footballers
Sheffield United F.C. players
Stoke City F.C. players
Norwich City F.C. players
People from Etruria, Staffordshire
Footballers from Stoke-on-Trent
English Football League players
Association football wing halves
FA Cup Final players